The Methodist Central Hall (also known as Central Hall Westminster) is a multi-purpose venue in the City of Westminster, London, serving primarily as a Methodist church and a conference centre. The building, which is a tourist attraction, also houses an art gallery, a restaurant, and an office building (formerly as the headquarters of the Methodist Church of Great Britain until 2000). It contains 22 conference, meeting and seminar rooms, the largest being the Great Hall, which seats 2,300.

Methodist Central Hall Westminster occupies the corner of Tothill Street and Storeys Gate just off Victoria Street in London, near the junction with The Sanctuary next to the Queen Elizabeth II Conference Centre and facing Westminster Abbey.

Methodist Central Hall Westminster also acts as an important spiritual and sacred place. one of its purposes is to spread faith and the Word of God.

History
Methodist Central Hall was erected by Wesleyan Methodists as one of their mixed-purpose 'central halls'. Central Hall was to act not only as a church, but to be of "great service for conferences on religious, educational, scientific, philanthropic and social questions". The hall was built in 1905–1911 on the site of the Royal Aquarium, Music Hall and Imperial Theatre, an entertainment complex that operated with varying success from 1876 to 1903. Construction was funded between 1898 and 1908 by the "Wesleyan Methodist Twentieth Century Fund" (or the "Million Guinea Fund", as it became more commonly known), whose aim was to raise one million guineas from one million Methodists. The fund closed in 1904 having raised 1,024,501 guineas (£1,075,727).

The building played host to several important events. Meetings of the suffragette movement took place at Methodist Central Hall in 1914. Scenes were re-enacted in the 2015 film Suffragette, some of which was shot in the hall.

Methodist Central Hall hosted the first meeting of the United Nations General Assembly in 1946. In return for the use of the hall, the assembly voted to fund the repainting of the walls of the church in a light blue. While it was being used by the UN General Assembly, the congregation relocated to the Coliseum Theatre.

It has been regularly used for political rallies—famous speakers have included Winnie Mandela, Mahatma Gandhi and Mikhail Gorbachev. In September 1972 the Conservative Monday Club held a much publicised "Halt Immigration Now!" public meeting in the main hall, addressed by several prominent speakers including members of parliament Ronald Bell, John Biggs-Davison, Harold Soref, and John Stokes. The Monday Club continued its use of the building until 1991 when it held two seminars there.

In 1968, Central Hall hosted the first public performance of Andrew Lloyd Webber's Joseph and the Amazing Technicolor Dreamcoat in a concert that also included his father (organist William Lloyd Webber who was musical director at Central Hall), his brother the cellist Julian Lloyd Webber and pianist John Lill.

In early 1966 the FIFA World Cup Jules Rimet Trophy was on display at Central Hall in preparation for the football tournament being held in England that summer. It was stolen from the hall on 20 March 1966 and was recovered seven days later in south London, but the thief was never caught. England won the trophy four months later. The Jules Rimet Trophy was stolen again in Brazil and never recovered, and so had to be replaced.

In 2017, Central Hall was host to the first FIFA Interactive World Cup final where Spencer Ealing (known as Gorilla) beat Kai Wollin (known as DETO).

In 2005 Central Hall controversially applied for a licence to sell alcohol in its café and conference venues. As the Methodist Church has traditionally promoted abstinence and usually forbids consumption of alcohol on church premises, many Methodists argued that the application was in defiance of church rules and a written objection was compiled.

It is frequently used for public enquiries, including those into the Ladbroke Grove rail crash, the sinking of the Marchioness pleasure boat, and the Bloody Sunday incident in Northern Ireland.

Architecture

The Methodist Central Hall is a Grade II* listed building. It was designed by Edwin Alfred Rickards, of the firm Lanchester, Stewart and Rickards. This company also designed the City Hall building in Cathays Park, Cardiff, with which it shares many similarities. Although clad in an elaborate baroque style, to contrast with Westminster Abbey, it is an early example of the use of a reinforced concrete frame for a building in Britain. The interior was similarly planned on a Piranesian scale, although the execution was rather more economical.

The original 1904 design included two small towers on the main (east) façade, facing Westminster Abbey. These were never built, supposedly because of an outcry that they would reduce the dominance of Nicholas Hawksmoor's west towers at Westminster Abbey in views from St James's Park. The hall was eventually finished in 1911.

The domed ceiling of the Great Hall is reputed to be the second largest of its type in the world. The vast scale of the self-supporting ferro-concrete structure reflects the original intention that Central Hall was intended to be a meeting place for "open-air preaching with the roof on".

The angels in the exterior spandrels were designed by Henry Poole.

Organ 
The organ was built in 1912 by William Hill & Sons and rebuilt and revised in 1970 by Rushworth and Dreaper. In 2011, Harrison & Harrison revised the layout, provided new slider soundboards and actions and painted the front pipes. The organ has 57 stops/68 ranks and 3,789 speaking pipes on four manuals and pedal. The stoplist since 2011:

 Couplers: III-I, IV-I, I-II, III-II, IV-II, IV-III, Sub and Super III, Sub and Super III, Unison off III, Unison off IV, I-P, II-P, III-P, IV-P.
 8 General Combinations, 8 Divisional Combinations for each Manual and the Pedal (on 256 Memory Levels); Continental Stepper (General Piston Sequencer + and -).

References

External links

 Methodist Central Hall – Church website
 Central Hall Westminster – Conference centre website
 The Sanctuary Westminster

Methodist churches in London
Cultural and educational buildings in London
Grade II* listed churches in the City of Westminster
Edwardian architecture in London
Exhibition and conference centres in London
Religion in the City of Westminster
Tourist attractions in the City of Westminster
Buildings and structures completed in 1911
20th-century architecture in the United Kingdom
Church buildings with domes